Marcos Vinícius may refer to:

Marcos Vinícius Bento (born 1992), Brazilian footballer commonly known as Marquinhos
Marcos Vinicius (fighter) (born 1979), Brazilian fighter
Marcos Vinícius de Jesus Araújo (born 1994), Brazilian footballer
Marcos Vinícius dos Santos Gonçalves (born 1979), Brazilian football manager commonly known as Marquinhos Santos
Marcos Vinícius Gomes de Lima, a Brazilian footballer commonly known as Dimba
Marcos Vinícius Gomes Nascimento (born 1991), Brazilian footballer
Marcos Vinícius Santos Miranda, a Brazilian footballer commonly known as Marcos Miranda
Marcos Vinicius Viana Ribeiro (born 1989), Brazilian footballer commonly known as Araruama
Marcus Vinícius Acácio, Brazilian volleyball player

See also
 Marcus Vinicius (disambiguation)